Adham Fawzy (born 2000) is an Egyptian chess player. He was awarded the title Grandmaster by FIDE in 2019. As of June 2021, he is the fourth-highest rated active Egyptian player, and seventh-highest in the continent.

Career 
He won the 2018 and 2019 African Junior Chess Championship.

He finished third in the 2021 African Chess Championship, qualifying for the Chess World Cup 2021.

References

External links

Adham Fawzy games at 365Chess.com

2000 births
Living people
Chess grandmasters
Egyptian chess players
Place of birth missing (living people)